Tal Ohana is the mayor of Yeruham, Israel.

Tal Ohana was elected mayor of Yeruham in 2018. She is the first woman to serve in this position in the town's history.

References

Women mayors of places in Israel
Year of birth missing (living people)
Living people